El Reencuentro 2011, also known as El Reencuentro: diez años después premiered on March 17, 2011 and will end the May 2, 2011 lasting 47 days. It's the second season for the reality show El Reencuentro. In this season, there are contestants of several famous realities from Telecinco. Seven pairs of ex-contestants with unfinished business (fights, love, etc.) from different reality shows (Gran Hermano, Gran Hermano VIP, Operación Triunfo, Supervivientes, Hotel Glam, La Casa de tu vida and Las Joyas de la Corona) are reunited and must live and fight together for the award.

Housemates

Alejandro, "Coyote Dax"
Alejandro entered the house on Day 1. He was a housemate from Gran Hermano VIP 1.

Chari
Chari entered the house on Day 1. She was a housemate from Gran Hermano 12. Chari was ejected along with Rubén on Day 10 as they had a big argument which the producers considered an aggression.

Almudena, "Chiqui"
Chiqui entered the house on Day 1. She was a housemate from Supervivientes 2007. Chiqui was ejected on Day 30 as she had a big argument with Natalia in which Chiqui grabbed her arm; this was considered an aggression.

David
David entered the house on Day 8. He was a housemate from La Casa de tu Vida 1. David was evicted along with Natalia on Day 36 after a housemate nomination with 3 of 3 votes.

Gerardo
Gerardo entered the house on Day 1. He was a housemate from Gran Hermano 11 Gerardo left the house on Day 20 as he felt uncomfortable his last week in the house.

Iván
Iván entered the house on Day 15. He was the winner of Gran Hermano 10. Iván became along with Loli the fifth pair to be evicted from El reencuentro on Day 43.

Javián
Javián entered the house on Day 36. He was a contestant from Supervivientes 2007 and Operación Triunfo. He was the last evictee along with Sofía on Day 43.

Jorge
Jorge entered the house on Day 1. He was a housemate from Las Joyas de la Corona.

Juanma
Juanma entered the house on Day 1. He was a housemate from La Casa de tu Vida 1. He became along Mónica the first housemate/pair to be evicted from El Reencuentro.

Juan Miguel
Juan Miguel entered the house on Day 1. He was a housemate from Hotel Glam.

Lara
Lara entered the house on Day 1. She was a housemate from Las Joyas de la Corona.

Loli
Loli entered the house on Day 15. She was a housemate from Gran Hermano 10. Loli became along with Iván the 5th pair to be evicted from El Reencuentro on Day 43.

Marta
Marta entered the house on Day 1. She was a housemate from Gran Hermano 2 and Gran Hermano VIP 1.

Mónica
Mónica entered the house on Day 1. She was a housemate from La Casa de tu Vida 1. She became along Juanma the first housemate/pair to be evicted from El Reencuentro.

Natalia
Natalia entered the house on Day 8. She was a housemate from La Casa de tu Vida 1. Natalia was evicted along with David on Day 36 after a housemate nomination with 3 of 3 votes.

Oliver
Oliver entered the house on Day 22. He was a contestant from Muejeres y Hombres y Viceversa 1. Oliver and Tamara were evicted on Day 29 after one week in the house.

Rubén
Rubén entered the house on Day 1. He was a housemate from Gran Hermano 12. Rubén was ejected along with Chari on Day 10 as they had a big argument which the producers considered an aggression.

Saray
Saray entered the house on Day 1. She was a housemate from Gran Hermano 11 She was ejected on Day 22 due to Gerardo left the house two days before.

Sofía
Sofía entered the house on Day 1. She was a housemate from Supervivientes 2007. She was the last evictee along with Javián on Day 43.

Tamara
Tamara entered the house on Day 22. She was a contestant from Muejeres y Hombres y Viceversa 1. Oliver and Tamara were evicted on Day 29 after one week in the house.

Vanessa
Vanessa entered the house on Day 8. She was a housemate from La Casa de tu Vida 1. She was evicted on Day 15 with Verónica.

Verónica
Verónica entered the house on Day 8. She was a housemate from La Casa de tu Vida 1. She was evicted on Day 15 with Vanessa.

Yola
Yola entered the house on Day 1. She was the winner from Hotel Glam.

Nominations table

Notes

  For the first round of nominations, the public was voting for the top four pairs to be immune from being nominated for eviction. The three pairs with the fewest save votes from the public will face possible eviction as the immune housemates/pairs will decide to either evict or save them. Juanma and Mónica, Gerardo and Saray, and Juan Miguel and Yola received the fewest public votes, hence were nominated for eviction. Also David and Natalia and Vanessa and Verónica entered as new housemates/pairs.
  The public was voting for the three pairs to be nominated for eviction. The three pairs with the fewest save votes from the public will face possible eviction as the immune housemates/pairs will decide to either evict or save them. Coyote and Marta, Gerardo and Saray, and Vanessa and Verónica received the fewest public votes, hence were nominated for eviction. As there was a tie between Gerardo and Saray, and, Vanessa and Verónica, the pair with most public votes, Jorge & Lara had their vote to evict counted as a double vote. Also Iván and Loli entered as new housemates/pairs.
  Saray was ejected on Day 22 as Gerardo left the house two days before. The rules point that if one member of a pair leaves, the other member must leave the house.
  This round the three pairs with the fewest votes were Chiqui and Sofía, Coyote and Marta, and Gerardo and Saray. The eviction was cancelled because Gerardo left the house and Saray was ejected.
  Last week Coyote & Marta won immunity for this week.
  There was a tie between Jorge and Lara, and, Oliver and Tamara, the pair with most public votes, Juan Miguel and Yola, had their vote to evict counted as a double vote.
  For this week's eviction, the three pairs with the fewest votes were nominated for eviction and the two saved pairs were asked as to the two pairs they wanted to evict.
  As of the conclusion of the Gala of Week 6 and all of Week 7, the public is voting for the Housemates-pair they want to win.

External links
 El Reencuentro Official Website at Telecinco
 Gran Hermano Main Site

2010 Spanish television seasons
2011 Spanish television seasons
All Stars 2